Joseph James McLaughlin (born July 1, 1957) is a former linebacker in the National Football League. He was born in Stoneham, Massachusetts.

Career
McLaughlin played with the Green Bay Packers during the 1979 NFL season before playing five seasons with the New York Giants. He played at the collegiate level at the University of Massachusetts Amherst.

See also
List of Green Bay Packers players
List of New York Giants players

References

1957 births
Living people
People from Stoneham, Massachusetts
Sportspeople from Middlesex County, Massachusetts
Green Bay Packers players
New York Giants players
American football linebackers
Players of American football from Massachusetts
UMass Minutemen football players